Handball competitions at the 2019 Pan American Games in Lima, Peru, were held from July 24 (two days before the opening ceremony) to August 5. The venue for the competition is the Sports Centre Hall 1 located at the Videna cluster. The venue also hosted judo. A total of eight men's and eight women's teams (each consisting of up to 14 athletes) competed in each tournament. This means a total of 224 athletes are competed.

The winner of each competition qualified for the 2020 Summer Olympics in Tokyo, Japan.

Competition schedule
The following is the competition schedule for the handball competitions:

Medal table

Medalists

Participating nations
A total of 10 countries have qualified athletes. The number of athletes a nation has entered is in parentheses beside the name of the country.

Qualification
A total of eight men's teams and eight women's teams qualified to compete at the games in each tournament. The host nation (Peru) qualified in each tournament, along with seven other teams in various qualifying tournaments.

Men

 Chile (3rd-placed finisher at the South American Games) and Colombia (5th at the Central American and Caribbean Games) competed in the last chance tournament.

Women

 Chile (3rd-placed finisher at the South American Games), Mexico and Guatemala (4th and 5th at the Central American and Caribbean Games) and Canada (loser of the North Zone Qualifying) competed in the last chance tournament.

See also
Handball at the 2020 Summer Olympics

References

External links
Results book

Handball at the 2019 Pan American Games
Handball
2019
Pan American Games